Nahlah Ayed (Arabic: نهله عَايِد) is a Canadian journalist, who is currently the host of the academic documentary program Ideas on CBC Radio One and a reporter with CBC News. She was previously a foreign correspondent with the network and has also worked as a parliamentary correspondent under The Canadian Press. Her reporting on contemporary Middle Eastern politics has garnered multiple awards, both domestic and international.

Early life
Ayed was born in Winnipeg, Manitoba in 1970 to Palestinian refugees Hassan and Nariman Ayed. The couple had immigrated to Canada in 1966 after experiencing difficulty in Germany, where Ayed’s father Hassan had initially sought refuge, and lived in suburban Winnipeg until Ayed was six years old. Despite living in a primarily white neighbourhood, Ayed’s parents sought to give her and her three siblings a traditional Arab upbringing: from a young age, Ayed became fluent in English, French, and Arabic, learning the first two languages from her immediate schooling and the last from her mother at home. At this point, fearing that their children would lack traditional values, Hassan and Nariman decided to move to a Palestinian refugee camp in Amman, Jordan, where the family would live with their other relatives and be entirely immersed in Arab culture. The family stayed there for seven years before moving back to Winnipeg in 1983.

After completing high school in Winnipeg, Ayed pursued a Bachelor of Science in genetics and a master’s degree in interdisciplinary studies at the University of Manitoba. Her time as a writer with the student newspaper at the university led her to the Master of Journalism program at Carleton University in Ottawa, where she also worked as a freelance writer for the Ottawa Citizen newspaper. Shortly after graduating, Ayed began working as a parliamentary correspondent for The Canadian Press in 1997, which marked the beginning of her career in political journalism.

Career
Ayed joined the CBC in 2002 on a freelance contract and, in 2003, served as the network’s Amman correspondent during the American invasion of Iraq. Ayed spent months in Baghdad prior to the outbreak of the subsequent war, and later returned to report live from Baghdad as the city fell. Her coverage of Iraq in the aftermath earned her a Gemini Award nomination.

From 2004 until 2009, Ayed was the CBC's Beirut correspondent, covering events throughout the Middle East region, including the 2006 Lebanon War and the 2008-2009 Gaza War. She received her second Gemini Award nomination in 2010 for her coverage of the Iran presidential elections the year prior, and her third nomination for her coverage of the 2011 uprisings in Egypt.

In 2012, Ayed published her memoir, titled A Thousand Farewells: A Reporter’s Journey from Refugee Camp to the Arab Spring, describing her early life and her experiences covering conflict in the Middle East. The book was a finalist for the 2012 Governor General's Literary Awards.

She joined the CBC's London, UK bureau in 2012. She returned to Canada in 2019 when it was announced that she would be the new host of Ideas, taking over from the retiring Paul Kennedy in September. Ayed has continued to regularly provide coverage of both Middle Eastern politics and international affairs at large, reporting on events such as Russia's annexation of Crimea, Brexit, and Europe's refugee crisis.

Awards

Undated Awards 

 The Canadian Press President's Award
 The LiveWire Award

Honorary Degrees 

 LL.D., University of Manitoba (2008)
 LL.D., Concordia University (2016)
 LL.D., University of Alberta (2018)

References

External links
  University of Manitoba alumni journal.
 
 

Living people
Carleton University alumni
Canadian people of Palestinian descent
People from Winnipeg
Journalists from Manitoba
Canadian television reporters and correspondents
Canadian radio reporters and correspondents
University of Manitoba alumni
Canadian women television journalists
Canadian Screen Award winning journalists
Canadian women radio journalists
CBC Radio hosts
1970 births
Canadian women radio hosts